Erik von Malottki (born 1 April 1986) is a German politician of the Social Democratic Party (SPD). He became a member of the Bundestag in the 2021 German federal election and he represents the constituency of Mecklenburgische Seenplatte I – Vorpommern-Greifswald II.

References 

Living people
1986 births
People from Grevesmühlen
Members of the Bundestag for the Social Democratic Party of Germany
Members of the Bundestag 2021–2025